Kodambal  is a village in the southern state of Karnataka, India. It is located in the chitguppa taluk of Bidar district in Karnataka.

Demographics
 India census, Kodambal had a population of 5543 with 2801 males and 2742 females.

Education

 Government primary school, Government High school, Govt Girls Hostel.Government Urdu primary school

Politics

Present Gram Panchayat Chairwoman: Shri. Rangamma. Present Taluka Panchayat member: Mr. Beerappa Marthand. PDO: Sangamesh.

See also
 Bidar
 Districts of Karnataka

References

External links
 http://Bidar.nic.in/

Villages in Bidar district